Here in America is a CD compilation of early songwriting demos and rare live recordings of concert performances given by American singer-songwriter Rich Mullins as he toured across America in 1987 with song collaborator Steve Cudworth (vocals/guitar) and Kyle Stevens (drums/vocals). Released posthumously on May 6, 2003, six years after his death, "Here in America" allows listeners to enjoy excerpts from Rich Mullins concerts prior to the release of "Awesome God" in 1988, which inevitably propelled him, as a recording artist, to a higher level of recognition by the CCM industry. The album comes with a Bonus DVD with two parts – "Live at Studio B", a 1997 concert with a Ragamuffin Band; and "12 Short Stories", which was recorded in February 1994 (although the DVD misidentifies it as 1993) during a two-day seminar led by Rich Mullins and Beaker at Family Broadcasting Corporation in South Bend, Indiana. Several segments of footage left off the release were made available publicly in 2018 on YouTube due to the efforts of a Mullins fan online petition the previous year.

CD track listing
 "Here in America" (Songwriting Demo)
 "Teaching Awesome God" (Live)
 "Verge of a Miracle" (Live)
 "Be With You" (Live)
 "O Come All Ye Faithful" (Songwriting Demo)
 "What Trouble Are Giants" (Live)
 "Praise Ye The Lord" (Live)
 "Hello Old Friends" (Live)
 "It Don't Do" (Live)
 "Screen Door" (Live)
 "Never Heard The Music" (Songwriting Demo)
 "None Are Stronger" (Live)
 "The Lord's Prayer" (Songwriting Demo)

DVD track listing
Live From Studio B:
I Will Sing
Sing Your Praise to the Lord
If I Stand
Calling Out Your Name
Elijah
Awesome God
We Are Not As Strong as We Think We Are
Let Mercy Lead
Boy Like Me – Man Like You
F Major Invention (J.S. Bach)
Screen Door
Hold Me Jesus
Sometimes By Step
Creed

12 Short Stories:
Sex and Self-Confidence
Perfection Is Boring
Be Assertive
Killing Philistines
Sensationalism
Worship Buzz
A Reason To Party
Life Is Good
Women & Tragedy
I Never Intended
Temptation In Germany
Driving Without Headlights

References

External links
Rich Mullins – Live at Family Broadcasting Corporation (2/12/1994)

2003 compilation albums
Rich Mullins albums
Compilation albums published posthumously
2003 live albums
Live video albums
Video albums published posthumously
Live albums published posthumously